Ruslan Lysenko (born 18 May 1976) is a Ukrainian biathlete. He competed at the 1998 Winter Olympics, the 2002 Winter Olympics and the 2006 Winter Olympics.

References

External links
 

1976 births
Living people
Ukrainian male biathletes
Olympic biathletes of Ukraine
Biathletes at the 1998 Winter Olympics
Biathletes at the 2002 Winter Olympics
Biathletes at the 2006 Winter Olympics
Sportspeople from Sumy